William Hooker (born June 18, 1946) is an American drummer and composer.

Early life and education
Hooker was born in New Britain, Connecticut, on June 18, 1946. He began to play the drums at the age of 12. In high school, he played in a rock band, then switched to jazz. After graduating from Central Connecticut College, Hooker moved to California and became interested in free jazz.

Career
Hooker moved to New York City in the mid-1970s and was part of the loft jazz scene, playing with musicians such as saxophonists David Murray and David S. Ware. His first recording as a leader was in 1976. His music was too radical to be commercially successful, and Hooker took other jobs to earn a living. This changed after he received praise for a 1988 recording, and he made frequent appearances at the Knitting Factory from early the following decade. Hooker was a founding member of the Text of Light, a musician's collective that released seven albums between 2004 and 2010.

Hooker has led several bands, including a drums–trumpet–saxophone trio and an organ trio. They usually do not feature a bass, "because of the intensity and volume of his drumming". He has also been the drummer in duos with guitarists, including Elliott Sharp and Thurston Moore. Hooker's playing and recordings have embraced a wide range and combination of musics, including free jazz, noise rock, electronics, contemporary classical, and experimental electronic.

The Down Beat reviewer of Hooker's Symphonie Of Flowers album wrote "Hooker uses history to enliven a suite of music that bounds through subgenres and percussive ideas".

"He is an elemental drummer of considerable force, equally at home in free-form jazz and avant-garde rock circles; he also experiments with electronics and turntables".

Discography
 ...Is Eternal Life (Reality Unit Concepts 1982) - featuring David Murray, Mark Miller, David S. Ware, Hasaan Dawkins, and Les Goodson
 Brighter Lights (Reality Unit Concepts 1986)
 Lifeline (Silkheart Records 1988) - William Hooker Quartet featuring Alan Michael, Claude Lawrence, William Parker, Mark Hennen, Charles Compo, Masahiko Kono
 The Firmament Fury (Silkheart 1989) - William Hooker Ensemble featuring Claude Lawrence, Charles Compo, Masahiko Kono, Donald Miller
 Shamballa: Duets with Thurston Moore and Elliott Sharp (Knitting Factory Works 1993)
 Envisioning (Knitting Factory Works 1994) - William Hooker and Lee Ranaldo
 Radiation (Positive Music 1994) - featuring Donald Miller, Brian Doherty, Charles Compo, Masahiko Kono
 Armageddon (Homestead 1995)
 Gift of Tongues (1995) - featuring Lee Ranaldo and Zeena Parkins
 Joy (Within)! (Silkheart 1996) - William Hooker - Billy Bang Duo
 Heat of the Light (Dream Sequences) (Rabid God Inoculator 1996) - Solo
 Tibet (Ummo 1996) - featuring Mark Hennen, Charles Compo, Donald Miller 
 Mindfulness (Knitting Factory Works 1997) - featuring DJ Olive and Glenn Spearman
 The Distance Between Us (Knitting Factory Works 1999)
 Bouquet: Live at the Knitting Factory 4.23.99 (Knitting Factory Works 2000) - Christian Marclay and Lee Ranaldo
 Hard Time (Squealer 2001) - featuring Jesse Henry, Richard Keene, Donald Miller, Doug Walker
 Black Mask (Knitting Factory Works 2002) - Duets with Andrea Parkins, Jason Hwang, Roy Nathanson
 Out Trios, Vol. 1: Monsoon (Atavistic 2003) - featuring Roger Miller and Lee Ranaldo
 Yearn for Certainty (2010) - featuring Sabir Mateen and Dave Soldier
 Crossing Points (2011) - featuring Thomas Chapin
 William Hooker Duo featuring Mark Hennen (2012)
 A Postcard From the Road (2012) - featuring Edward Ricart and Dave Ross
 Channels of Consciousness (2012) - featuring Adam Lane, Dave Ross, Chris DiMeglio, and Sanga
 Heart of the Sun (2013) - featuring Roy Campbell and Dave Soldier
 Red (Atypeek Music 2015) - William Hooker Quartet featuring Matt Lavelle, Mark Hennen, Larry Roland and William Hooker
 Aria (Multatta Records 2016) - featuring Dave Soldier, On Davis, Mark Hennan, Richard Keene, and Louie Belogenis
 Pillars ... at the Portal (Multatta Records 2018) – featuring Jon Irabagon, James Brandon Lewis, Luke Stewart, and Anthony Pirog
 Remembering (Astral Spirits 2018) - William Hooker Trio featuring Ava Mendoza and Damon Smith
 Symphonie of Flowers (ORG Music, 2019)
 Cycle of Restoration (2019) - featuring Mark Kirschenmann and Joel Peterson
 Full On! (2019) - Duos with Mark Kirschenmann, featuring guest Marcus Elliot
 Nels Cline, Alan Licht & William Hooker Live (2020)

References

External links
 William Hooker interview by Matt Silcock, Perfect Sound Forever, February 2000.
The Trove interview by Sharon Pendana

1946 births
Living people
Avant-garde jazz musicians
American jazz drummers
American jazz composers
American male jazz composers
20th-century American drummers
American male drummers
20th-century American male musicians
Knitting Factory Records artists
AUM Fidelity artists
NoBusiness Records artists